Defenders of Wildlife is a 501(c)(3) non-profit conservation organization based in the United States. It works to protect all native animals and plants throughout North America in their natural communities.

Background
Defenders of Wildlife is a national conservation organization that works to conserve wildlife, protect wildlife habitat and safeguard biodiversity. Founded in 1947, Defenders of Wildlife was originally called Defenders of Fur Bearers, and worked to preserve wild animals. Although its work has broadened to include wildlife habitat and biodiversity, protecting wild animals—especially large carnivores—remains a central goal.

The organization is headquartered in Washington, D.C., with field offices in Anchorage, Sacramento, Denver, Santa Fe, New Mexico, Asheville, North Carolina and Seattle.

The current president and CEO is Jamie Rappaport Clark, who has been with Defenders since 2004 and took on her current role in 2011. Clark holds a B.S. in wildlife biology from Towson University and a M.S. in wildlife ecology from the University of Maryland. Prior to her time at Defenders, she worked more than 20 years in conservation positions for the federal government, including serving as director of the U.S. Fish and Wildlife Service. She is an expert on the Endangered Species Act of 1973 (ESA) and under her leadership at the U.S. Fish and Wildlife Service, she secured the passage of the landmark National Wildlife Refuge System Improvement Act of 1997.

During Clark's tenure, and under the executive team consisting of Renee Stone (formerly of the National Audubon Society), Jamie Clark and Jim Stofan, the National Labor Relations Board found merit in 4 Unfair Labor Practice charges in August of 2022. The ULPs consisted of Defenders termination of a union organizer, withholding information from bargaining unit members, and direct dealing with employees. Defenders executive team decided not to settle the case with an illegally terminated employee. The case will be heard in February of 2023 in Washington, DC. Defenders currently employs two union-avoidance firms - Littler Mendelson and Pillsbury Winthrop Shaw Pittman. Clark has been credited with creating a 'culture of fear' at the organization. Clark refused to voluntarily recognize Defenders United, the union of Defenders of Wildlife.

From 1948 to 1976, Dorothy Burney Richards served as director of Defenders of Wildlife. She held the position of honorary director from 1976 until her death in 1985.

"Eye on Palin" campaign
In 2009, Defenders of Wildlife announced a new media campaign named "Eye on Palin". The campaign focused on what the group termed the "extreme anti-conservation policies" of the Alaskan governor Sarah Palin, in particular, her support of the aerial hunting of wolves. In response to it, Governor Palin put out a statement calling Defenders of Wildlife an "extreme fringe group" defending her "predator control program". She attacked the non-profit group for allegedly "twisting the truth in an effort to raise funds from innocent and hard-pressed Americans".

The organization filed suit against the federal government when it claimed that the Endangered Species Act did not apply to government projects outside the United States. In Lujan v. Defenders of Wildlife, the US Supreme Court ruled that the Defenders of Wildlife suit lacked standing.

Areas of work 

 Protecting Imperiled Species – Defenders works to prevent species from going extinct in the face of rising threats. They do this by working to influence local, state and federal policy and laws, especially the Endangered Species Act. Specifically, the organization has identified "key species" that play a broader role in their ecosystems and serve as ambassador wildlife species. Those include: wolves, bees, bats, sea turtles, Sonoran pronghorn, sharks, mussels, black-footed ferrets, desert tortoises, grizzly bears, parrots, wolverines, gopher tortoises, amphibians, whales, migratory shorebirds, jaguar, bison, freshwater fish, sea otters, Florida panthers, manatees, polar bears, California condors, and sage-grouse.
 Endangered Species Act – the organization launched the Center for Conservation Innovation in 2017. As part of its leadership on the ESA, the organization launched the Center for Conservation Innovation (CCI) to improve endangered species conservation in the United States that uses data, technology and interdisciplinary approaches to pioneer innovative solutions to conservation problems. It created the largest searchable database of ESA documents, ESAdocs Search, containing nearly 14,000 documents.
 Defending Habitat – the organization works to protect important wildlife habitat with particular focus on protecting public lands designated for the primary protection of wildlife conservation – the National Wildlife Refuge System. However, Defenders also works on other federal public lands and waters as well as with private lands owners where imperiled wildlife habitat could be affected. Specifically, the organization has identified "featured landscapes" of special importance for wildlife conservation: southern Alaska, the Arctic, Cascadia, the Sierra Nevada, the Mojave, Sky Islands, the Northern Rockies, the Sagebrush Sea, the Northern Plains, the Southern Rockies, the Southern Appalachians, the Florida Panhandle, the Greater Everglades, Eastern Carolinas and New England.
 Promoting Coexistence – a major focus of the organization is their focus on coexistence efforts to mitigate conflict between people, livestock and predators where their paths intersect. They have worked especially with wolves and bears to dispel intolerance, limit negative interactions, reduce depredations of livestock and promote nonlethal tools, strategies and solutions for dealing with wildlife.
 Combating Climate Change –  Defenders works with wildlife and natural resource managers to address the impacts of climate change and to develop adaptive strategies to incorporate into conservation plans.
 Advocating for International Species – the organization works internationally to combat the illegal wildlife trade and wildlife trafficking.

Related organizations
Defenders of Wildlife Action Fund is a 501 (c)(4) that works to influence elected federal officials to protect natural heritage and hold leaders accountable. The action fund is affiliated with Defenders of Wildlife and shares the same conservation goals. It conducts accountability campaigns, petition drives and grassroots advocacy. The action fund voluntarily discloses its large political contributions.

Awards and recognition
Defenders of Wildlife was listed as one of the best wildlife charities in 2006 by the magazine Reader's Digest.

Defenders of Wildlife is a Partner Organization of GlobalGiving.

President and CEO Jamie Rappaport Clark was awarded the Audubon Society's Rachel Carson Award for her lifetime commitment to protecting endangered and threatened species and their habitats.

In October 2021, this conservation organization began partnering with Litton Entertainment to produce Jeff Corwin's North American zoological television series Wildlife Nation with Jeff Corwin as part of ABC's Litton's Weekend Adventure.

References

External links
 Defenders.org
 DefendersActionFund.org
 Defenders Action Center

Environmental organizations based in Washington, D.C.
Charities based in Washington, D.C.
Organizations established in 1947